Guillermo Gianninazzi was an Argentine architect and sculptor, born in Italy around 1880 and died in Rosario, Argentina in 1948. He moved to Argentina in order to work as a sculptor and write artistic novels.

Works
 "Monumento a los Padres" (Monument to Fathers), in the front of the Medical Sciences school of the National University of Rosario.
 "El Auriga y su cuadriga" (Auriga and his carriage) in front of the Governing Delegation of the Province of Santa Fe, in front of Rosario's San Martín Plaza
 Monument to Leandro Alem

Argentine architects
Italian emigrants to Argentina
1880s births
1948 deaths
19th-century Argentine sculptors
19th-century Argentine male artists
Male sculptors
20th-century Argentine sculptors
20th-century Argentine male artists